Megachile estebana is a species of bee in the family Megachilidae. It was described by Theodore Dru Alison Cockerell in 1924.

References

Estebana
Insects described in 1924